Argyria hannemanni is a moth in the family Crambidae. It was described by Stanisław Błeszyński in 1960. It is found in Bolivia.

References

Argyriini
Moths described in 1960
Moths of South America